Argyrotaenia altera is a species of moth of the family Tortricidae. It is found in Carchi Province, Ecuador.

The wingspan is about 14 mm. The ground colour of the forewings is greyish brown, but brown in the basal half of the wing. The markings are dark brown, the proximal edges finely edged with white. The hindwings are brown and slightly paler than the forewing.

Etymology
The species name refers to the specific difference to Argyrotaenia dichroaca and is derived from Latin altera (meaning different).

References

Moths described in 2008
altera
Moths of South America